The Aleksandar Nikolić Hall, formerly known as Pionir Hall, is an indoor sports arena located in Palilula, Belgrade, Serbia. The official seating capacity of the arena is 8,000.

It was renamed in 2016 in honour of Serbian basketball player and coach Aleksandar Nikolić. The hall is well known for its frequent matches between different basketball clubs, especially Crvena Zvezda (Red Star Belgrade),Partizan, and foreign clubs.

Projected by Ljiljana and Dragoljub Bakić, the hall has been described as the "architectural icon of the postmodernist Belgrade".

History

Constructed in 1973 by Ljiljana and Dragoljub Bakić under a tight deadline, the modernist building won the architects a "Grand Prix of the Belgrade Architecture Salon". The structure was noted for its use of repeated elements and natural light.

The arena hosted the final round of EuroBasket 1975, the final of the EuroLeague's 1976–77 season (in which Maccabi Tel Aviv defeated Pallacanestro Varese), and the FIBA EuroCup's 1997–98 season final. In October 1989, the 16th World Judo Championships took place in Pionir Hall.

The arena hosted several preliminary round games of the EuroBasket 2005 and 2013 World Women's Handball Championship.

On 23 February 2016, the name of the arena was changed from Pionir Hall to Hall Aleksandar Nikolić, after the former basketball player and coach, Aleksandar "Aca" Nikolić.

In April 2017, the arena played host to the Davis Cup World Group Quarterfinal between Serbia and Spain, with Serbia winning the tie 4-1 to advance to the semifinals. 

In 2019, the hall was thoroughly renovated, at a cost of €2 million euros. The renovation included new seats, telescopic stands, a new hardwood court and screens, new lighting, modernization of the ventilation and air-conditioning systems, and an increased seating capacity.

Concerts

See also
List of indoor arenas in Serbia

References

External links

 Hala Pionir 

1973 establishments in Serbia
Basketball venues in Serbia
Handball venues in Serbia
Indoor arenas in Serbia
Judo venues
KK Crvena Zvezda home arenas
KK Partizan
Sports venues completed in 1973
Sports venues in Belgrade
Volleyball venues in Serbia
Palilula, Belgrade